Queen of the Disco is the second studio album by Bosnian alternative rock band Sikter. It was released on 1 March 2002 by Bock. The album was exclusively released for Bosnia and Herzegovina, Serbia and Montenegro and Croatia.

It was recorded in 2001 in Sarajevo after the great success of the band's debut album, Now, Always, Never. Producers of album were the front-man of the band, Enes Zlatar, and the chairman of the Bock label, Oliver Dujmović. On this album the prevailing musical style is Disco with elements of soul, funk and reggae.

Theme of the album
"Queen Of The Disco" can be said to be a conceptual album. Every song on the album has an intro, or a skit, which on the CD is one track of its own preceding every song. The intros are from 4 to 27 seconds long and are all spoken-word. Every skit follows the same theme. In the first skit, a man talks about feeling lonely while walking alone on a cold night, ultimately coming to a disco and entering ("for no reason, I go in"). The man, who by the second skit is clearly the main character and narrator of the story, goes on to talk about seeing a woman at the disco, but it is clear to the listener that they never meet. He keeps coming back to the disco night after night, looking for her. The general feeling is that she became an obsession, and that without her, the narrator could not be happy ("without her, the world was darker"). He saw her again once, on the street, but she "looked right through" him. The narrator ultimately ends up spending the rest of his life never knowing or seeing her (the Queen of the disco) again, but he keeps coming back to the disco. He stays at the disco "forever"; the disco ends up being hell, which could be interpreted in a literal, as well as a symbolic sense.

Hidden track
After the final song on the CD, "Love You Baby", there is a hidden track, which ends approximately at the five-minute mark. At six minutes and one second, the hidden track begins, with the unnamed song sang in Bosnian. The song could be said to be about life, death and a person's sense of security in life, where the person is content with everything "old" and familiar, whereas new things frighten him/her. The chorus consist of a single line, "Trideset je godina" ("it is thirty years"), which could be interpreted as someone or something being 30 years old, or that 30 years have passed since something occurred. The hidden track is only the second song by Sikter that is sung in Bosnian; the first was "JTM" from their first album "Now, Always, Never". "JTM" is short for "jebem li ti miša", a joke-swear which is sung as the chorus. It literally translates to "I'm f***ing your mouse", meaning that the person saying the swear is not happy with, or is slightly angry at the person at which the swear is directed, but being formulated as it is, it is clear that the anger is not deep at all, as the swear cannot be taken seriously. It could be said that the swear is an ambiguous type of humor. Where "JTM" is a humorous song, the hidden track on "Queen Of The Disco" is a song with a serious tone and a serious theme.

Track listing

Personnel
Enes Zlatar Bure, vocals, keyboards, producer
Esad Bratović - guitars
Dejan Rokvić - bass
Igor Čamo - keyboards
Faris Arapović - drums
Oliver Dujmović - producer

References

External links

2002 albums
Sikter albums